Air Force is a 1943 American World War II aviation film directed by Howard Hawks and starring John Garfield, John Ridgely, Gig Young, Arthur Kennedy, and Harry Carey. The film was distributed by Warner Bros. and produced by Hal B. Wallis and Jack L. Warner. Made in the aftermath of the Pearl Harbor attack, it was one of the first of the US patriotic films, sometimes referred to as wartime propaganda.

The film's storyline revolves around an actual incident that occurred on December 7, 1941. An aircrew ferries an unarmed 1940 series Boeing B-17C Flying Fortress heavy bomber, named the Mary-Ann, across the Pacific to the United States Army Air Corps base at Hickam Field. They fly right into the middle of the Japanese air attack on Pearl Harbor and the beginning of America's major involvement in the Second World War. An uncredited William Faulkner wrote the emotional deathbed scene for Ridgely, who played the commander and pilot of the Mary-Ann.

Plot
On December 6, 1941, at Hamilton Field, near San Francisco, the crew of the Mary-Ann, a U.S. Army Air Corps B-17C, are ordered across the Pacific to Hawaii, one of a flight of nine Flying Fortress bombers.

Master Sergeant Robbie White, the Mary-Anns crew chief, is a long-time veteran, whose son Danny is an officer and pursuit (fighter) pilot. The navigator, Lieutenant Monk Hauser Jr., is the son of a hero of the World War I Lafayette Escadrille. The pilot is Michael "Irish" Quincannon Sr., the co-pilot is Bill Williams, and the bombardier is Tom McMartin. Sergeant Joe Winocki is a disgruntled gunner who, as an aviation cadet in 1938, washed out of flight school after he caused a mid-air collision in which another cadet was killed. Quincannon was the flight instructor who requested a board of inquiry into the accident.

With the United States still neutral, the Mary-Ann and the other B-17s fly, fully equipped except for ammunition, to Hickam Field. They arrive on December 7, 1941, during the Japanese attack on Pearl Harbor. In its aftermath, the tired crew is ordered, with little rest, to fly first to Wake Island, and finally to Clark Field in the Philippines, both also still under Japanese attack. En route, the crew listens to President Franklin D. Roosevelt ask Congress for a declaration of war. They take along two passengers: fighter pilot Lieutenant Thomas "Tex" Rader and a small dog, "Tripoli", the Marines' mascot on Wake Island.

When they land at Clark Field, White learns that his son was killed while trying to lead his squadron into the air during the first attack. Soon after, Quincannon volunteers his bomber (the only one available) to attack a Japanese invasion fleet, but the Mary-Ann is swarmed by enemy carrier fighters and forced to abort after losing two engines. The fatally wounded Quincannon orders his men to bail out, then he blacks out. Winocki remains aboard and pilots the Mary-Ann to a successful belly landing when he is unable to lower the landing gear.

Having told the now dying Quincannon that the Mary-Ann is ready to fly, the crew works feverishly through the night to repair their bomber, scavenging parts from other damaged B-17s, as the Japanese Army closes in. Chester, the assistant radio operator, volunteers to fly as gunner in a two-seat observation plane. They are caught in an enemy air raid. Chester bails out after the pilot is killed, but is machine-gunned while descending in his parachute, then strafed to death on the ground. Winocki and White shoot down the Zero fighter with .30 caliber machine guns. When the pilot stumbles from the burning wreckage, Winocki shoots him. The crew barely manages to finish the repairs and refueling when the Japanese overrun the airfield. With help from Marines and Army soldiers, Mary-Ann takes off, her waist machine guns returning fire.
  
As they head to Australia, with Rader as the reluctant pilot and the wounded Williams as co-pilot, they spot a large Japanese naval invasion task force directly below. The crew radios the enemy's position and circles until reinforcements arrive; the Mary-Ann then leads the attack that devastates the Japanese fleet (this dramatic sequence mirrors the real events of the Battle of the Coral Sea).

Later in the war, a bombing attack on Tokyo is finally announced to a roomful of bomber crews, among them several familiar faces from the Mary-Ann, including Rader, now a B-17 pilot. As the bombers take off, President Roosevelt offers inspiring words in voice-over, as the air armada heads towards the rising sun.

Cast

Production

Director Howard Hawks credited the concept of the film to Lieutenant General Henry H. Arnold, Commanding General of the Army Air Forces, based on the experiences of a flight of B-17s that left Hamilton Field, California, on the night of December 6, 1941, and literally flew into the war the next morning at Pearl Harbor. Executive producer Jack Warner was adamant that the film be ready for release by 7 December 1942, the first anniversary of the attack on Pearl Harbor. To that end, miniatures for battle sequences were filmed in May and June 1942, before completion of the script and storyline.

Although pre-production work had already been done, the official start of the production on 18 May 1942 was tied to the War Department's approving the script. Development of the film was concurrent with scriptwriting by Dudley Nichols, with some characters based on Air Corps personnel Hawks met while traveling to Washington, D.C., to confer with Arnold and the War Department Motion Picture Board of Review. Nichols's script, submitted 15 June, was 207 pages long (twice that of a normal feature-length film), had its initial 55 pages devoted to "character development," and was not finished.

Principal photography, consisting of aerial shots and exteriors, took place at Hendricks Army Airfield, Florida. For water scenes and shooting miniatures shots, MacDill Field, Florida; Randolph Field, Texas; and Santa Monica Bay, California, were used. Shooting began 18 June 1942, using a rented mock-up of a B-17 interior, in which the 10 principal characters performed for a month. The company then moved by train to Drew Army Airfield, Florida, at the end of July to spend the next month shooting aerial sequences coordinated by Paul Mantz, chief pilot and aerial technical coordinator for the production. Drew was selected because of fears that use of aircraft marked as Japanese might cause panic on the West Coast.

At the end of August, Hawks returned to Hollywood and engaged William Faulkner to rewrite two scenes, including the death of the Mary-Anns pilot. By then, the film, scheduled to be completed by 17 September, was three weeks behind schedule and only half completed. Production featured a celebrated clash between producer Hal Wallis and Hawks over the latter's constant changing of dialogue as scenes were shot. Hawks was briefly replaced on 4 October by Vincent Sherman, but returned from "illness" on October 10 to take back primary direction. Sherman remained as second-unit director to assist with completion of the film, which wrapped on 26 October 1942, failing to shoot 43 pages of script and 33 days over schedule, too late to meet its 7 December release date.

Wallis wrote that AAF Captains Sam P. Triffy and Hewett T. Wheless were technical advisors to the film, and that Triffy in particular made significant contributions to the storyline, dialogue, and sets.< "Shorty" Wheless had previously been a B-17 aircraft commander in the Philippines with the 19th Bomb Group and had been one of the survivors evacuated to Australia in December 1941. He was at Randolph Field, Texas, in the process of appearing as himself in the Academy Award-winning short film Beyond the Line of Duty when he assisted on Air Force.

Aircraft
The U.S. Army Air Forces provided the various aircraft that appear in the film:
 Ten Boeing B-17B/C/D Flying Fortresses were from Hendricks Army Airfield at Sebring, Florida. The majority were actually RB-17Bs upgraded to B-17C/D standards, as was the B-17 that portrayed Mary-Ann. The bomber's on-screen, "wartime security" serial number 05564 (actually "40-5564") is listed in the film credits. The bomber's actual serial number was 8584 ("38-584"), being so marked on the left side of the vertical tail.  In the film's beginning stock footage flight ĺine sequence, an early model YB-17 can be seen in the background of the bomber lineup.
 North American AT-6 Texans and Republic P-43 Lancers were painted as Japanese fighters. 
 Bell P-39 Airacobras and Curtiss P-40C Warhawks from Drew Army Airfield portrayed the AAF fighters.
 Six Martin B-26C Marauders from MacDill Field were painted as Japanese bombers.

The "real" Mary-Ann was reported lost in the Pacific shortly after production wrapped, according to information attributed to the production's technical advisor; actually, no early Flying Fortresses served for long in Pacific combat after Pearl Harbor. Two early RB-17B aircraft, upgraded to the later series "D" standards, played the Mary-Ann; AAF serial numbers 38-584 and 39-10 (briefly seen in background projection as John Garfield boards the aircraft) were reclassified in late 1943 as instructional air frames; following the war, both were scrapped in January 1946. Another claim, attributed to a newspaper article, was that the real Mary-Ann went on tour to promote the film, then was assigned to Hobbs Army Air Field, New Mexico, then later to Amarillo Army Air Field, where it was assigned to a ground school.

Historical inaccuracies
The basic premise of Air Force, that a flight of B-17s flying to reinforce the defense of the Philippines flies into the attack on Pearl Harbor, reflects actual events. From that point on, however, all of the incidents are fictitious. No B-17 reinforcements reached the Philippines; the survivors of those already based there retreated to Australia less than two weeks after the war began. The major bombing mission depicted at the film's climax most closely resembles the Battle of the Coral Sea five months later. Miniature shooting for its battle scenes was filmed in May and June 1942, concurrent but probably coincidental with Coral Sea and the Battle of Midway.

Anti-Japanese propaganda in the film included scenes in which the aircrew is forced to land on Maui Island and are shot at by "local Japanese". There is a later assertion by the Hickam Field commander that local vegetable trucks from Honolulu knocked the tails off parked P-40 fighters as the attack began. Also, Lieutenant Rader claims that a Japanese civilian blocked the road in front of his car, as he hurried to the airfield, and then shot at him with a shotgun. As detailed in Walter Lord's book Day of Infamy, later investigations proved that no Japanese-American was involved in any kind of fifth column sabotage during the Pearl Harbor attack.

In Air Force, a tail gun is installed on the Mary-Ann. The Flying Fortress used in the film played the part of a 1940 Boeing B-17C; no early B-17s, series "A" through "D", were fitted with a tail-mounted machine gun at the factory. That feature was not officially added until Boeing rolled out its heavily redesigned B-17E series. In the film, however, a member of the Mary-Anns aircrew makes a improvised field modification, removing the tail cone and creating a manned, single machine gun position. In real life, some aircrews did install a broomstick painted black in the clear tail cone to discourage attacks from the rear. As detailed in Herbert S. Brownstein's Flying Fortress volume The Swoose: Odyssey of a B-17, a few B-17D aircrews field-installed a remotely controlled (via a pullcord) .30 caliber machine gun in their tails.

Reception
Critical acclaim followed the film's premiere. Air Force echoed some of the emotional issues that underlay the American public's psyche at the time, including distrust of Japanese Americans. In naming it one of the "Ten Best Films of 1943", Bosley Crowther of The New York Times characterized the film as "... continuously fascinating, frequently thrilling and occasionally exalting ...".  When seen in a modern perspective, the emotional aspects of the film seem out of proportion, and although it has been dismissed as a piece of wartime propaganda, it still represents a classic war film that can be considered a historical document. When initially released, Air Force was one of the top three films in commercial revenue in 1943.

Later reviews of Air Force noted that this was a prime example of Howard Hawks's abilities; "Air Force is a model of fresh, energetic, studio-era filmmaking".

Air Force placed third (behind The Ox-Bow Incident and Watch on the Rhine) as the best film of 1943 selected by the National Board of Review of Motion Pictures.

Box office
According to Warner Bros. records, the film earned $2,616,000 domestically and $1,513,000 internationally.

Awards and nominations
Air Force editor George Amy won the 1944 Academy Award for Best Film Editing, defeating his counterparts on Casablanca, For Whom the Bell Tolls, Five Graves to Cairo, and The Song of Bernadette.

Dudley Nichols was nominated for Best Writing, Original Screenplay; Hans F. Koenekamp, Rex Wimpy, and Nathan Levinson for Best Effects, Special Effects; and Elmer Dyer, James Wong Howe, and Charles A. Marshall for Best Cinematography, Black-and-White.

Radio adaptation
Air Force was presented on Lux Radio Theatre 12 July 1943. The adaptation starred Harry Carey and George Raft.

Home media
Howard Hawks' Air Force was released on DVD in 2007 by Turner Entertainment and Warner Bros. Entertainment. The single DVD disc also contains the special video features: the Oscar-nominated Technicolor drama short Women at War, two Warner Bros. patriotic war cartoons, The Fifth-Column Mouse and Scrap Happy Daffy, and the drama's theatrical release trailer.

In popular culture
An Air Force plot detail is loosely referenced in the film Pulp Fiction (1994) during Christopher Walken’s monologue playing Captain Koons. Koons recounts the story of boxer Butch Coolidge’s grandfather’s watch: Butch’s grandfather, facing certain death at the hands of the Japanese at the WWII battle of Wake Island, gives his watch to a gunner on an Air Force bomber by the name of Winocki.

References

Notes

Citations

Bibliography

 Dolan, Edward F. Jr. Hollywood Goes to War. London: Bison Books, 1985. .
 Evans, Alun. Brassey's Guide to War Films. Dulles, Virginia: Potomac Books, 2000. .
 Hardwick, Jack and Ed Schnepf. "A Buff's Guide to Aviation Movies". Air Progress Aviation, Vol. 7, No. 1, Spring 1983.
 Hickey, Lawrence J. (with Birdsall, Steve; Jonas, Madison D.; Rogers, Edwards M.; and Tagaya, Osamu). Ken’s Men Against the Empire: The Illustrated History of the 43rd Bombardment Group During World War II (Volume I: Prewar to October 1943, The B-17 Era). International Historical Research Associates, 2016. .
 McCarthy, Todd. Howard Hawks: The Grey Fox of Hollywood. New York: Grove Press, 2000. .
 Orriss, Bruce. When Hollywood Ruled the Skies: The Aviation Film Classics of World War II. Hawthorne, California: Aero Associates Inc., 1984. .

External links
 
 
 
 
 
 

1943 films
1940s war films
American aviation films
American black-and-white films
American World War II propaganda films
1940s English-language films
Films scored by Franz Waxman
Films about the United States Army Air Forces
Films directed by Howard Hawks
Films produced by Hal B. Wallis
Films set in the Philippines
Films set in Tampa, Florida
Films whose editor won the Best Film Editing Academy Award
Pearl Harbor films
Films with screenplays by Dudley Nichols
Warner Bros. films
World War II films based on actual events
American war films
Pacific War films